Madeleine Taylor may refer to:

 Madeleine Taylor (basketball), Australian basketball player
 Madeleine Taylor-Quinn, née Madeleine Taylor, Irish politician